Krzysztof Linkowski (born 26 October 1949) is a retired Polish runner who specialized in the 800 metres.

At the 1968 European Junior Championships he won a bronze medal in the 800 metres, as well as a bronze medal in the 4 x 400 metres relay. At the 1971 European Indoor Championships he won a silver medal in 4 x 800 metres relay together with Zenon Szordykowski, Michał Skowronek and Kazimierz Wardak. This team still has the Polish indoor record in the event. At the 1972 European Indoor Championships he won a bronze medal in 4 x 720 metres relay together with Zenon Szordykowski, Stanisław Waśkiewicz and Andrzej Kupczyk. He won another medal in 4 x 720 metres relay at the 1973 European Indoor Championships, this time together with Lesław Zajac, Czesław Jursza and Henryk Sapko.

He competed in the 800 metres at the 1975 European Indoor Championships, but without reaching the final. He became Polish indoor champion in 1973.

References

1949 births
Living people
Polish male middle-distance runners
People from Gryfice
Sportspeople from West Pomeranian Voivodeship
20th-century Polish people